= Hulikeri =

- Village
- Country: India
- State: Karnataka
- District: Dharwad

Government
  - Type: Panchayat raj
  - Body: Gram panchayat

Population (2011)
  - Total: 1,505

Languages
  - Official: Kannada
- Time zone: UTC+5:30 (IST)
- ISO 3166 code: IN-KA
- Vehicle registration: KA
- Website: karnataka.gov.in

Hulikeri is a village in Alnavar taluk in Dharwad district of Karnataka, India.

== Demographics ==
As of the 2011 Census of India there were 323 households in Hulikeri and a total population of 1,505 consisting of 792 males and 713 females. There were 183 children ages 0–6.
